The Cottage Ball Bank is the main sports facility on the Caribbean island of Sint Eustatius. The facility contains a soccer pitch, open-air swimming pool, sports hall, baseball field (known as the Fredrick Cranston Ball Field), and several other fields. The facilities are also used by the island's schools. It is the national stadium as it hosts the matches of the Sint Eustatius national football team. In 2019 the Government of Sint Eustatius financed a number of renovation and expansion projects at the facility.

The facility also houses a Cruyff Court soccer pitch with artificial turf which was donated by the Johan Cruyff Foundation. Construction of the court began in 2006. It was refurbished in 2019. In 2021 a canopy roof was installed over the court.

References

National stadiums
Football venues in Sint Eustatius
Oranjestad, Sint Eustatius